Ceprano is a town and comune in the province of Frosinone, in the Latin Valley, part of the Lazio region of central Italy.

History

Ceprano was part of the Papal States, from roughly the 6th century until 1870. After Italian Unification and the Capture of Rome, the town was part of the Kingdom of Italy, a constitutional monarchy ruled from Rome by the House of Savoy. Since 1946 Ceprano has been part of the Italian Republic.

On 27 January 1862 the Rome-Ceprano Railroad was opened for service.

On 28 May 1944 Ceprano was taken by Canadian troops as part of the Allies' push against German occupation.

Ceprano's origins are connected to the Roman colony founded in 328 BC on the left bank of the Liri River, called Fregellae. Nowadays the ruins of the city can be seen in the territory of the close by municipality of Arce.

See also
Homo cepranensis

References

Cities and towns in Lazio
Paleoanthropological sites